Momba was a Nkoya kingdom in what is today known as the Kalomo District of Zambia.

See also
Kabulwebulwe
Kahare
Mombas
Mutondo

References
State penetration and the Nkoya experience in western Zambia

History of Zambia